This is a list of the largest dry docks in the world, including excavated and floating docks.

References

External links
 Worldwide Ship Repair Directory 2006-2007, The Motor Ship 2006,
 Ship2yard, All Shipyards.
 trusteddocks.com, Shipyards & Drydocks search.

Drydocks